Chakram is a 2003 Indian Malayalam-language action thriller film written and directed by A. K. Lohithadas, starring Prithviraj Sukumaran, Meera Jasmine, Binoy, Vijeesh, and Chandra Laxman.

Premise

Chandrahasan, a truck driver, falls in love with Indrani and marries her. His life takes an unexpected turn when his best friend Giri kidnaps Indrani and he sets out to rescue her.

Cast
 Prithviraj Sukumaran as Chandrahasan
 Meera Jasmine as Indrani
 Vijeesh as Premkumar 
 Binoy  as Giri
 Aniyappan as Manoharan
 Machan Varghese as Maniyannan
 Chandra Lakshman as Madhuri
 Meghanadhan as Gopalan
 Baburaj as Sudhakaran
 Manju Pathrose as Deepa
 Santhosh Keezhattoor as Satheeshan
 Geetha Nair as Chandrahasan's mother
 Ambika Mohan as Madhuri's mother
 Priyanka as Kusumam, Maniyans wife 
 Shaju
Kalabhavan Shajohn as Truck Driver

Production
The film was originally planned with Mohanlal, Dileep and Vidya Balan in the lead roles, with Kamal as the director. After few days of filming, the project was shelved. Chakram was supposed to be the acting debut of Vidya Balan.

Music
The film's soundtrack contains 6 songs, all composed by Raveendran and Lyrics by Gireesh Puthanchery.  
All the songs are super hits.

References

External links
 

2000s Malayalam-language films
Indian action drama films
2003 action drama films
2003 films
Indian films about revenge
Films scored by Raveendran
Films directed by A. K. Lohithadas